Urals Mussorgsky State Conservatoire is a musical university in Yekaterinburg, Sverdlovsk Oblast, Russia. The Ural State Conservatory was founded in 1934. In 1939 the Conservatory had its first graduates.

Notable alumni
Anatoliy Andreyev – Buryat composer
Anastasiya Bespalova – composer
Yuri Gulyayev – opera singer
Marina Domashenko – opera singer
Boris Shtokolov – opera singer
Yevgeny Kolobov – conductor, founder of the Novaya Opera Theatre (Moscow)

Notable faculty
Vladimir Kobekin

References

External links
 "Ekaterinburg Travel company about USC"

Universities in Sverdlovsk Oblast
Music schools in Russia
Buildings and structures in Yekaterinburg
Educational institutions established in 1934
1934 establishments in the Soviet Union
Cultural heritage monuments of federal significance in Sverdlovsk Oblast